Goya Foods, Inc. is an American producer of a brand of foods sold in the United States and many Spanish-speaking countries. It has facilities in the United States (including Puerto Rico), the Dominican Republic and Spain. It is under third-generation ownership of the Spanish-American Unanue family, and is headquartered in Jersey City, New Jersey.

History

Goya Foods was founded in 1933 (some sources claim 1936), by Prudencio Unanue Ortiz (1886–1976) from Valle de Mena, Spain.  Prudencio immigrated to Puerto Rico, where he met and married Carolina Casal (1890–1984), also a Spanish immigrant; they later moved to New York City. The family had originally opened a small store called "Unanue and Sons" in 1922; however, it was converted to wholesale in the mid 1930s. Prudencio purchased the "Goya" name from a Moroccan sardine company because he believed that his last name was too difficult to pronounce for American customers and also liked the association to Spanish artist Francisco Goya.

When Prudencio Unanue died in 1976, he left Goya to his sons, Joseph, Charles, Francisco and Anthony. Upon his father's death, Joseph A. Unanue became chief executive of Goya, then a fairly small, $8.5 million company. As president and chief executive of the company, Joseph shared control with his brother Francisco, who served as president of Goya de Puerto Rico Inc., responsible for much of the company's manufacturing operations. Joseph A. Unanue's son, Joseph F. Unanue, was general manager and vice president of Goya de Puerto Rico from 1989 to 1996, when he became executive vice president at the company's New Jersey, assuming the No. 2 position in the company; he died two years later.

During Joseph A. Unanue's decades at the head of the company, Goya grew to become a major corporation. By 1998, the company produced about 800 food items (including rice,  beans, sauces, and spices), had 2,000 employees, and about $700 million in revenue. Joseph A. Unanue was ousted from his position as Goya chairman and CEO in 2004, amid an feud in the Unanue family about the direction of the company. At the time of Joseph A. Unanue's ouster, Goya was generating from $750 million, to more than $1 billion in revenue. Joseph's son Andy Unanue, the chief operating officer of the company, also left Goya amid the disagreement, prompting litigation. Robert Unanue and his cousin Francisco Unanue made the decision to remove Andy, who had previously been considered the "heir apparent" to Goya. Joseph Unanue retained a significant stake in the company, and retained a seat on its board; he died in 2013. Robert Unanue has been the chief executive since 2004. The fracturing of Goya's ownership among its founders' descendants has frequently led to disputes about the company's strategy.

In 2012, the company began construction on a $127 million distribution center in the industrial Meadowlands area of Jersey City, backed by state tax incentives that aided the company in its move from Secaucus to the Jersey City site.

In 2019, Goya had talks with The Carlyle Group about a possible buyout; the company ultimately decided not to sell itself to The Carlyle Group.

Description

Goya manufactures and distributes products from the Spanish, Puerto Rican, Caribbean, Mexican, Cuban and Central and South American cuisine. Their products are sold in stores and supermarket chains throughout the United States, Puerto Rico, and international markets. In 2006, Forbes ranked Goya 355th on its list of the largest private companies in the United States.

Between 2014 and 2016 Goya opened five new facilities including manufacturing and distribution centers located in New Jersey, Texas, California, and Georgia to meet rising consumer demand. Currently, Goya Foods is headquartered on a  lot in Jersey City, New Jersey.  Goya also operates a manufacturing facility in San Cristóbal, Dominican Republic, and a distribution center in Bayamón, Puerto Rico.

Corporate affairs

Goya Gives 
"Goya Gives" is a program to support various charities, scholarships, and events, and includes donations of products to food shelters and food banks during times of crisis, such as Hurricane Maria in Puerto Rico.

MyPlate/MiPlato campaign
In 2012, the company joined First Lady Michelle Obama's "My Plate" healthy eating initiative.

President Trump comments

On July 9, 2020, at a White House roundtable discussion of the Hispanic Prosperity Initiative with President Donald Trump, Goya Foods co-owner and CEO Robert Unanue praised Trump, saying the country was "truly blessed [...] to have a leader like President Trump, who is a builder" and adding, "we have an incredible builder and we pray, we pray for our leadership, our president and for our country, that we continue to prosper and to grow."

Unanue's comments prompted a call for a public boycott on social media, which was supported by various Latino public figures, including Alexandria Ocasio-Cortez, Julian Castro and Lin-Manuel Miranda. In response, Unanue stated the next day that this was a "suppression of speech" and declined to apologize for his comments. Supporters called for an anti-boycott "buycott" in support of the company. Goya used its corporate Twitter account to call attention to its pledge made at the White House event to donate cans of food for those affected by COVID-19, and a Goya supporter launched a GoFundMe campaign that raised money to buy Goya products and donate them to food pantries.

On December 7, 2020, Unanue stated that Ocasio-Cortez was named 'employee of the month' after her boycott call led to a 1000% sales spike. On January 26, 2021, Goya's board of directors voted to censure Unanue following statements disputing the 2020 United States presidential election, banning him from speaking to the media. An anonymous CNN source familiar with the board’s actions claimed that Unanue's statements "imperiled the future of the company and endangered the lives of some of the shareholders," and that the controversy following Unanue's White House appearance had not been good for the company. The majority of the company's board favored removing Unanue from his position, but the family-owned business regulations did not allow for that.

During CPAC 2021, Goya Foods CEO Unanue claimed the 2020 election was illegitimate, and that Donald Trump is 'the real, the legitimate, and the still actual president'.

Cultural impact 
Goya Foods logo and imagery has been "appropriated" by multiple contemporary fine artists who use the images in their paintings, prints and sculptures, most notably Cuban-American artist Ric Garcia, sculptor Alexander Mijares, painter John Kilduff, and others.

See also
 La Costeña (food company)

References

External links

 Goya Foods
 Goya Foods, Collection 1960–2000

American companies established in 1936
Food product brands
Food manufacturers of the United States
Food and drink companies based in New Jersey
Companies based in Jersey City, New Jersey
Hispanic and Latino American cuisine
Hispanic and Latino American culture in New York City
Hispanic and Latino American culture in New Jersey
Latin American cuisine
Spanish-American cuisine
Spanish-American culture in New York City
Food and drink companies established in 1936
Conservatism in the United States
1936 establishments in New York City
Privately held companies based in New Jersey